The George Hoffman House is an historic home which is located in West Whiteland Township, Chester County, Pennsylvania. 

It was listed on the National Register of Historic Places in 1984.

History and architectural features
Built in five sections, four of which are stone, the George Hoffman House is considered a vernacular additive dwelling, with the oldest sections dated to the eighteenth century.

Also located on the property are a contributing shed, a double-decker stone barn and a corn crib.

It was listed on the National Register of Historic Places in 1984.

References

Houses on the National Register of Historic Places in Pennsylvania
Houses in Chester County, Pennsylvania
National Register of Historic Places in Chester County, Pennsylvania